Tessalit Airport  is a desert airport serving Tessalit, a village in the Kidal Region of Mali. A third, unpaved  runway runs parallel to the primary runway. The Tessalit non-directional beacon (Ident: TZE) is located on the airport.

See also
Transport in Mali
List of airports in Mali

References

External links
 OpenStreetMap - Tessalit Airport
 OurAirports - Tessalit Airport
 FallingRain - Tessalit

 Google Earth

Airports in Mali